Hun Airport  is an airport serving Hun, capital of the Jufra District in Libya. The runway is just southeast of the city.

See also
Transport in Libya
List of airports in Libya

References

External links
 OpenStreetMap - Hon
 OurAirports - Hon Airport
   Great Circle Mapper - Houn
 FallingRain - Hon Airport
 
 Google Earth

Airports in Libya